Mërgim Bajraktari (born 27 May 1993 in Basel) is a footballer who plays for FC Liestal. Born in Switzerland, he represented Albania at youth international levels.

Club career
On 1 July 2015, Bajraktari started a trial at Scottish Premiership side Hearts and he started in a 2–0 friendly win over Irish side Bohemian FC on the same day.

References

1993 births
Living people
Footballers from Basel
Kosovo Albanians
Swiss people of Albanian descent
Swiss people of Kosovan descent
Association football midfielders
Swiss men's footballers
Albanian footballers
Kosovan footballers
Albania youth international footballers
Albania under-21 international footballers
Yverdon-Sport FC players
FC Stade Nyonnais players